Clarice (Clare) J. Coyne is an American plant geneticist whose work focuses on the role of legumes in crop improvement. She is a Fellow of the American Association for the Advancement of Science.

Life 
She graduated from Oregon State University.

She works for the Agricultural Research Service. She teaches at Washington State University.

Selected publications

References 

Plant geneticists
Year of birth missing (living people)
American geneticists
Living people
Oregon State University alumni
United States Department of Agriculture people
Fellows of the American Association for the Advancement of Science